The Academy of General Dentistry (AGD) is a professional association of general dentists from Canada and the United States.

History and mission
The academy was incorporated on August 2, 1952.

Paula Jones became its first female president in 2008.

Headquarters
The academy is headquartered in Chicago, Illinois, United States.

Membership
It has 40,000 member dentists in the United States, Canada and in many countries across the globe.

Publications
The AGD publishes two publications, General Dentistry, its bimonthly, peer-reviewed journal, and AGD Impact, the organization's monthly newsmagazine.

Leadership
The AGD Executive Committee (EC) is composed of eight elected officers: the president-elect, vice president, secretary, treasurer, speaker of the House of Delegates, editor, and the immediate past president.
 Gerald J. Botko, DMD, MAGD (President)
 Hans P. Guter, DDS, FAGD (President-Elect)
 Merlin P. Ohmer, DDS, MAGD (Vice President)
 Abe Dyzenhaus, DDS, FAGD (Secretary)
 Donald A. Worm, Jr., DDS, MAGD, ABGD (Treasurer)
 Robert M. Peskin, DDS, FAGD (Speaker of the House)
 Timothy F. Kosinski, DDS, MAGD (Editor)
 Bruce L. Cassis, DDS, MAGD (Immediate Past President)

References

External links
 
 knowyourteeth.com Consumer-oriented website operated by the academy

501(c)(6) nonprofit organizations
Dental organizations based in the United States
Dental organizations based in Canada
Medical and health professional associations in Chicago
1952 establishments in Illinois
Organizations established in 1952
Medical and health organizations based in Illinois